This is a list of wars involving Papua New Guinea, German New Guinea or Territory of New Guinea.

References 

History of Papua New Guinea
Proxy wars
Papua New Guinea
Wars